Alexander Mason Wright (18 October 1925 – 15 March 1999) was a Scottish professional footballer who played for Bowhill Rovers, Hibernian, Barnsley, Tottenham Hotspur, Bradford Park Avenue and Falkirk.

Playing career
Wright began his career with youth side Bowhill Rovers. He joined Hibernian where he featured in three official matches. Wright signed for Barnsley in August 1947. The forward scored 31 goals in 84 appearances between 1947–50 for Oakwell based club. In September 1950, Wright signed for Tottenham Hotspur in a £12,000 transfer deal. Wright scored on his senior debut against Chelsea at Stamford Bridge on 3 March 1951. He was a member of the Spurs Push and run First Division championship winning team  of 1950-51. Wright transferred to Bradford Park Avenue in August 1951 and went on feature in 131 matches and netting a further 25 goals. After leaving the Yorkshire side he joined Falkirk where he played in both matches of the replayed Scottish Cup final against Kilmarnock in 1957. Falkirk were the eventual 2–1 winners. Wright played a total of 95 matches and scored 20 goals between 1955–59 for the Brockville Park team.

Honours
Falkirk
 Scottish Cup winner:1956-57

References

External links

Falkirk Herald report of the 1957 Cup final

1925 births
1999 deaths
Footballers from Kirkcaldy
Scottish footballers
Hibernian F.C. players
Barnsley F.C. players
Tottenham Hotspur F.C. players
Bradford (Park Avenue) A.F.C. players
Falkirk F.C. players
Scottish Football League players
English Football League players
Association football forwards
Scottish Junior Football Association players
Bowhill Rovers F.C. players